Muhammad Mazharuddin Ibn Nishati also known as "Ibn Nishati" was a 17th century Deccani language court poet of Golconda Sultan Abdullah Qutb Shah. His Masnavi PhulBan-"Flower garden" composed in 1656 into Dakhini Urdu from Persian masnavi Basatin of 14th Century.

PhulBan

The composition genre of PhulBan is a blend of romance and adventures, with 3500 lines and 2000 couplets it is a collection of anecdote leading to each other, the opening element of the book is a tale narrated by a Dervish to the king of the mythical city of gold. Further stories consist of fabled Chinese merchants, illustrious kings, fictitious princes and princesses, fairy-tales, mythical birds and mendicant Dervish's and Yogis.

As claimed by the author Ibn Nishati, the composition is a Dakhini Urdu translation of Persian language work Basatin-(Gardens) by Ahmad Zubairi written in the reign of the 14th century Delhi sultan Muhammad bin Tughluq. 

According to Sunil Sharma-(Professor of Persian and Comparative Literature at Boston University)-an article published by British Library on 22 December 2017; "This Persian Basatin has generally been considered as a reference to a lost work, but it is most likely the 15th-century Indo-Persian prose romance, Basatin al-uns (Garden of companionship) written by Muhammad ibn Sadr Taj ‘Abdusi Akhsitan Dihlavi, a work that had a moderate degree of readership in the early modern period."

References

 History of Urdu Literature, by T. Grahame Bailey-1929
 Phulban - a Persian romance, by British Library
 In the Dakhni romantic tale ‘Phulban’, love meets conspiracy and adventure, by Sunil Sharma-2017
 The 'Flower Garden' (Phulban), an illustrated Dakhni romance, by Sunil Sharma-2017
 The complete book of Muslim and Parsi names, by Menka Gandhi-2004

Indian manuscripts
17th-century Indian books